Suresh Krishnan is an Indian film director and screenwriter who works in Bollywood and Malayalam films. Suresh made his directorial debut with the Malayalam film Bharatheeyam (1997). He mostly works as an associate director in Bollywood films. In 2020, he contested in the reality TV series Bigg Boss (Malayalam season 2).

Early life
Suresh Krishnan was born on 5 June 1966 in Trivandrum, Kerala, India to M. V. Krishnan Nair and Saraswathy Amma. He studied at SMV School, Thiruvananthapuram and graduated from Mahatma Gandhi College, Thiruvananthapuram.

Film career
Suresh Krishnan began his career in films as an assistant director to filmmakers Rajiv Anchal in the Malayalam film Butterflies, followed by Kashmeeram and Guru (1997). Later, he worked as an assistant director to Priyadarshan.

He made his independent debut as a director in 1997 with the Malayalam film Bharatheeyam, followed by the family drama Achaneyanenikkishtam (2001), Vasanthamalika (2003), Pathinonnil Vyazham (2010), and the thriller Nakhangal (2013). Even though, he continued to work as an associate director to Priyadarshan in more than 25 films, mostly in Bollywood, including Malamaal Weekly (2006), Bhool Bhulaiyaa (2007), Kanchivaram (2008), De Dana Dan (2009) and Sharukh Khan starred Billu Barber among other films.

In 2020, Suresh contested in the reality television show Bigg Boss (Malayalam season 2) on Asianet, hosted by actor Mohanlal. He entered the house on 5 January 2020 on day-1 as one among the 17 housemates and was evicted on day-21.

Filmography

References

External links
 

1966 births
Indian film directors
Living people
Bigg Boss Malayalam contestants